William Kemp (born 29 June 1977) is an English actor and dancer.

Life and career
Kemp was born in Hertfordshire, England. Trained at the Royal Ballet School, at age 17 he was accepted at dance company Adventures in Motion Pictures (AMP). He won the lead role of The Swan in Matthew Bourne's Swan Lake from 1997 to 2000 in both London and Broadway. In 2002 he could be seen dancing to "Stuff Like That" in a Peter Lindbergh-directed commercial for Gap's "For Every Generation" campaign and in 2004, he appeared alongside Sarah Jessica Parker in two Francis Lawrence-directed spots, "Color" and "Shine", for Gap's "How Do You Share It" campaign. He famously turned down a lucrative modelling contract with Giorgio Armani, citing not wanting to be confused as a model as opposed to an actor as the reason for his decision.

Kemp made his acting debut as a Werewolf in the 2004 action horror film Van Helsing, opposite Hugh Jackman and Kate Beckinsale. He played the horse Nugget as well as The Young Horseman in the 2007 West End revival of Equus starring Daniel Radcliffe. The part of Nugget required him to don a wire horse mask and metal hooves/horseshoes, and carry Radcliffe on his back while galloping. He had a role in Step Up 2: The Streets as Blake Collins, director of the Maryland School of the Arts (MSA) and brother of Chase Collins.

Personal life

Kemp and his wife, Gaby Jamieson, have a daughter, Thalie and a son, Indigo.

Filmography

Film

Television

References

External links
 
 
 

1977 births
21st-century English male actors
English male ballet dancers
English male film actors
English male television actors
Living people
Male actors from Hertfordshire
People educated at the Royal Ballet School